The Goldsmiths' Professorship of Materials Science is a professorship in the University of Cambridge, associated with the Department of Materials Science and Metallurgy.

The professorship was established by grace of 20 November 1931 as the Goldsmiths' Professorship of Metallurgy to replace the Goldsmiths' Readership in Metallurgy. A further gift of £12,500 was received from the Goldsmiths' Company in 1933.  It was retitled the Goldsmiths' Professorship of Materials Science by grace 4 of 19 June 1991.

Goldsmiths' Professors of Metallurgy
 1932  Robert Hutton     (retired 1942)
 1945  George Wesley Austin
 1958  Sir Alan Cottrell      (resigned 1965)
 1966  Robert Honeycombe
 1984  Derek Hull (retired 1991)
 1990 Sir Colin John Humphreys
 2008 Anthony Cheetham

Goldsmiths' Professors of Materials Science

2018 Manish Chhowalla

Sources
 Cambridge University Officers

References 

1931 establishments in England
Materials Science, Goldsmiths'
Faculty of Physics and Chemistry, University of Cambridge
Materials Science, Goldsmiths', Cambridge